It Was the Son is a 2012 Italian comedy-drama film directed by Daniele Ciprì. The film was selected to compete for the Golden Lion at the 69th Venice International Film Festival, where Ciprì won the Osella for Best Cinematography.

Premise 
The main story unfolds within the frame story of an older man waiting to pay bills at a post office in Palermo, who captivates his listeners by promising to tell the story of a boy who killed his father over a scratched car. Nicola Ciraulo is a father (Toni Servillo as Nicola Ciraulo) trying to teach his son (Alfredo Castro as Busu) the basics of his maritime salvage / scavenging business. Soon thereafter, Nicola's daughter is killed by mafioso. This murder entitles the family to compensation for their loss, which brings out their greed and begins the central conflict of the story.

Cast 
 Toni Servillo as Nicola Ciraulo
 Giselda Volodi as Loredana Ciraulo
 Alfredo Castro as Busu
 Fabrizio Falco as Tancredi Ciraulo
 Aurora Quattrocchi as Nonna Rosa

Reception 

Variety called it "an annoying parody of an Italo pic" and stated that it diminished Italy's international filmmaking reputation. The Hollywood Reporter said that the film "has curiosity value, but it ends up feeling too flat and bleak."

References

External links
 

2012 films
2012 comedy-drama films
2010s Italian-language films
Italian comedy-drama films
Sicilian-language films
2010s Italian films